The 2015 Gombe State gubernatorial election was the 8th gubernatorial election of Gombe State. Held on April 11, 2015, the People's Democratic Party nominee Ibrahim Hassan Dankwambo won the election, defeating Muhammad Inuwa Yahaya of the All Progressives Congress.

PDP primary
PDP candidate and incumbent governor, Ibrahim Hassan Dankwambo clinched the party ticket. He won with 492 votes out of the 504 delegates, while eight votes were invalid and four delegates were absent. He won the primary through an affirmation poll.

Candidates
Ibrahim Hassan Dankwambo

APC primary
APC candidate, Muhammad Inuwa Yahaya defeated 2 other contestants to clinch the party ticket. He won with 905 votes to defeat his closest rival, Usman Bayero Nafada, who received 727 votes. Murtala Aliyu received 22 votes. 1,700 delegates was accredited.

Candidates
Muhammad Inuwa Yahaya
Usman Bayero Nafada
Murtala Aliyu

Results 
A total of 12 candidates contested in the election. Ibrahim Hassan Dankwambo from the People's Democratic Party won the election, defeating Muhammad Inuwa Yahaya from the All Progressives Congress.

References 

Gombe State gubernatorial elections
Gombe gubernatorial
April 2015 events in Nigeria